The Augusta Mountains are a small mountain range in Pershing, Churchill and Lander counties of Nevada.

To the northeast the range merges with the Fish Creek Range. To the north across Jersey Valley lies the Tobin Range and to the west across the Dixie Valley is the Stillwater Range. The Clan Alpine Mountains and the New Pass Range lie to the south and to the east across Antelope Valley are Ravenswood Mountain and the Shoshone Range.

The Range is included within the  Augusta Mountains Wilderness Study Area.

The fossil aquatic reptile Augustasaurus was discovered in the Triassic Favret Formation in the Augusta Mountains and named after the range.

References 

Mountain ranges of Nevada
Mountain ranges of Churchill County, Nevada
Mountain ranges of Lander County, Nevada
Mountain ranges of Pershing County, Nevada